Besat Expressway is an expressway in southern Tehran. It is from Basij Mostazafin Interchange to Besat Square and it passes Tehran southern Bus Terminal.

Expressways in Tehran